Thor Kristian "Mr Frisk" Martinsen (born 12 July 1945) is a Norwegian ice hockey player who played for the Norwegian national ice hockey team. He participated at the Winter Olympics in 1964, 1968, 1972 and 1980.

On 18 April 2009, he was appointed as honorary member of Frisk Tigers. He played 302 matches for the club during his career. He also played 113 national team matches, including 4 Olympic Games and 13 World Championships. He currently works in Frisk Tigers' junior sporting committee.

References

External links

1945 births
Living people
Frisk Asker Ishockey coaches
Frisk Asker Ishockey players
Ice hockey players at the 1964 Winter Olympics
Ice hockey players at the 1968 Winter Olympics
Ice hockey players at the 1972 Winter Olympics
Ice hockey players at the 1980 Winter Olympics
Norwegian ice hockey defencemen
Olympic ice hockey players of Norway
People from Halden
Sportspeople from Viken (county)